Hell money is a modernized form of joss paper printed to resemble legal tender bank notes. The notes are not an official form of recognized currency or legal tender as their sole intended purpose is to be offered as burnt offerings to the deceased as a solution to resolve their assumed monetary problems in the afterlife. This ritual has been practiced by modern Chinese and across East Asia since the late 19th century, and some Wicca-based faiths in recent years have adopted this practice.  Early 20th century examples bore resemblance to minor commercial currency of the type issued by businesses across China until the mid-1940s.

The identification of this type of joss paper as "hell bank notes" or "hell money" is largely a Western construct, since these items are simply regarded as yet another form of joss paper (or ) in East Asian cultures and have no special name or status.

The name "hell"
The word hell on hell bank notes refers to Diyu ("underworld prison"; also , dìfǔ, "underworld court"). These words are printed on some notes. In traditional Chinese belief, it is thought to be where the souls of the dead are first judged by the Lord of the Earthly Court, Yama (Yanluo Wang). After this particular judgment, they are either escorted to heaven or sent into the maze of underworld levels and chambers to atone for their sins. People believe that even in the earthly court, spirits need to use money.

The concept of Diyu parallels purgatory as taught by certain Christian denomininations. A popular anecdote claims that the word hell was introduced to China by Christian missionaries, who preached that all non-Christian Chinese people would go to hell after death. The word "Hell" was thus misinterpreted to be the proper English term for the afterlife, and was thusly adopted as such. Some printed notes attempt to correct this by omitting the word "hell" and sometimes replacing it with "heaven" or "paradise". These particular bills are usually found in joss packs meant to be burned for Chinese deities, and are usually differently colored but have the same design as hell bank notes.

Designs

Earlier examples of these notes were issued in denominations of 5 and 10 yuan and upwards, with such amounts being considered adequate until inflation took hold within China from 1944. The soaring denominations of authentic currency was soon reflected in that issued for the afterlife, and after 1945 the majority of Hell banknotes were issued in denominations of $10,000 or higher. These earlier issues more commonly depict landscape scenes, temples or trains, and the numerous varieties may literally number into the millions.

Modern Hell bank notes are known for their large denominations, ranging from $10,000 to several billions. The obverse usually bears an effigy of the Jade Emperor, the presiding monarch of heaven in Taoism, and the countersignature of Yanluo, King of Hell. There is usually an image of the "Bank of Hell" on the reverse of the notes.

A commonly sold Hell bank note is the $10,000 note that is styled after the old United States Federal Reserve Note. The obverse contains, apart from the portrait of the Jade Emperor, the seal of the Bank of Hell consisting of a picture of the bank itself. Many tiny, faint "Hell Bank Note"s are scattered on the back in yellow. These are sold in packs of 50 to 150, and are wrapped in cellophane.

Stores that specialize in selling ritual items, such as the religious goods stores in Malaysia, also sell more elaborately decorated notes that have a larger denomination than the usual $10,000 note. Some bills do not portray the Jade Emperor, and portray other famous figures from Chinese mythology instead, such as the Eight Immortals, the Buddha, Yama, or images of dragons.  Some even portray famous people who are deceased, such as US President John F. Kennedy, Albert Einstein and Marilyn Monroe.

Customs 
When burning the notes, the notes are placed as a loose bundle, in a manner that is considered respectful. Alternatively, in some customs, each bank note may be folded in a specific way before being tossed into the fire due to the belief that burning real money brings bad luck.

While the custom of burning "hell bank notes" remains legal in China, the Ministry of Civil Affairs has, as of 2006, banned the practice of "vulgar" burned offerings for the deceased. According to the Ministry, the ban on offerings such as paper "luxury villas, sedan cars, mistresses, and other messy sacrificial items" was part of an effort to eradicate "feudal" and superstitious behavior.

Giving someone living "Hell bank notes" is considered a great insult. In fact, in some areas it is considered a curse calling the King of Hell to collect that person. 

The University of Toronto experienced controversy after members of the University's Graduate House team distributed red envelopes containing joss money, allegedly in error, as part of its Lunar New Year's celebrations in 2022.

See also

 Ancestor worship
 Ghost Festival
 Joss paper
 Religious goods store
 Charon's obol
 Lucky money

References

 Smith, Ward & Matravers, Brian (1970). Chinese Banknotes, p. 144. Shirjieh Publishers, Menlo Park, California

External links 

Practices in Chinese folk religion
Chinese inventions
Chinese numismatic charms
Death customs
East Asian culture
Exonumia
Sacrifice
Buddhism and death